Walter Moore (1899–1972) was an English professional footballer who played as an outside forward or as a right-back. He played five matches in the Football League Third Division North for Nelson in the 1924–25 season, making his debut in the 2–1 win against Halifax Town on 25 October 1924. For the majority of his career, however, Moore played in local league football for several clubs in the South Yorkshire area.

References

1899 births
People from Darfield, South Yorkshire
1949 deaths
English footballers
Association football fullbacks
Association football outside forwards
Darfield F.C. players
Nelson F.C. players
Wath Athletic F.C. players
English Football League players
Date of birth missing
Date of death missing